Jerya may refer to:
 Jaria
 Jiria